Nottingham is an unincorporated community and census-designated place located in West Nottingham Township in Chester County, Pennsylvania. The community is located at the intersection of U.S. 1 and Pennsylvania Route 272 near the border with East Nottingham Township, a short distance north of the Maryland border. As of 2020, the CDP has a population 1,260.

It is home to the 651 acre Nottingham County Park, a serpentine barrens listed as a National Natural Landmark. Herr's Snacks plant, founded in 1946, is also located in the community. The U.S. Post Office for Nottingham is located along Baltimore Pike.

Demographics

References

External links

Unincorporated communities in Chester County, Pennsylvania
Unincorporated communities in Pennsylvania